The List of World Branding Awards winners provide details of the winners of the World Branding Awards, an international award presented to some of the best global and national brands for their work and achievements in branding. The awards are organised by the World Branding Forum, a registered global non-profit organisation based in London.

The first awards ceremony was held at One Whitehall Place at the Royal Horseguards Hotel in London on October 26, 2014. The event was hosted by David Croft from Sky Sports.

Sixty nine brands from 25 countries won an award. Each brand is named "Brand of the Year" in their respective categories. The "Brand of the Year" logo is a registered trademark. The awards gave special recognition to Tony Fernandes, Group CEO of AirAsia and Chairman of Queens Park Rangers F.C., naming him "Brand Builder of the Year" for his outstanding work in building the airline brand.

The Paris ceremony had an emphasis on food, beverage, luxury, fashion, lifestyle, hospitality, and service brands. Fifty brands from 22 countries were awarded at this ceremony.

In 2015, 118 brands from 30 countries were honoured with an award. The ceremony took place at Kensington Palace in London. The event was hosted by Olivia Wayne from Sky Sports.

In 2016, over 120,000 consumers from around the world voted for more than 2,800 brands from 35 countries. 210 brands from 30 countries were declared winners. The ceremony was held again in London's Kensington Palace. Guests included the United Arab Emirates Ambassador to the United Kingdom, Sulaiman Almazroui, and the Philippines Ambassador, Evan Garcia. The event was hosted by David Croft.

In 2017, over 3,000 brands from 35 countries were nominated, and more than 135,000 consumers from around the world participated during the voting period. 245 Brands from 32 countries were awarded.

In 2018, the Americas Edition of the awards—hosted by comedian Moody McCarthy—saw over 80,000 consumers vote for more than 1,500 brands from 22 countries from the Americas and the Caribbean, whilst the main awards ceremony in Kensington Palace later that year—hosted by David Croft—saw 270 brands from 33 countries named “Brand of the Year”.

In 2019, the second Animalis Edition, which focused on pet and animal brands, saw 114 brands from 38 countries named "Brand of the Year".

The awards trophy is made in England, and is on display at the Museum of Brands, Packaging & Advertising in London. In 2016, a newly designed 24 karat gold plated trophy was introduced for all winners. This new design is a solid trophy which highlights the "Brand of the Year" registered trademark logo.

Winners of the World Branding Awards

2022–2023

Global Edition

The ceremony for the 2022-2023 Brand of the year award was held on 3rd November 2022 at Kensington Palace in London, UK.

2019–2020

Global Edition
The 2019 awards ceremony (Global Edition) was held at the State Apartments at Kensington Palace in London.

2018–2019

Global Edition
The 2018 awards ceremony (Global Edition) was held at the State Apartments at Kensington Palace in London.

Americas Edition
The 2018 Americas Edition of the awards was held at The Plaza on Fifth Avenue in New York City.

2017–2018 
The Global Edition awards ceremony for the 2017 awards took place at Kensington Palace in London.

2016–2017 
The awards ceremony for the 2016 awards took place at Kensington Palace in London.

2015–2016 

The awards ceremony for the 2015 awards took place at the State Apartments of Kensington Palace in London.

2014–2015 
Winners of the World Branding Awards, presented in London and Paris.

Winners of the Animalis Edition

2019–2020
The Animalis Edition of the World Branding awards focuses on pet and animal brands. The awards ceremony for 2019 took place at the Hofburg Palace in Vienna.

2017–2018 
The Animalis Edition of the World Branding awards focuses on pet and animal brands. The awards ceremony for 2017 took place at the Hofburg Palace in Vienna.

See also 
 World Branding Awards
 World Branding Forum

References

External links
 World Branding Awards website
 World Branding Forum

Business and industry award recipients
Lists of award winners